The 2022–23 Ferencvárosi TC season is the club's 124th season in existence and the 14th consecutive season in the top flight of Hungarian football. In addition to the domestic league, Ferencváros are participating in this season's editions of the Hungarian Cup and the UEFA Europa League.

Transfers

Summer

In:

Out:

Source:

Winter

In:

Out:

Source:

Pre–season and friendlies

Competitions

Overview

Nemzeti Bajnokság I

League table

Results summary

Results by round

Matches

Hungarian Cup

UEFA Champions League

First qualifying round

Second qualifying round

Third qualifying round

UEFA Europa League

Play-off round

Group stage

The draw for the group stage was held on 26 August 2022.

Knockout phase

Round of 16
The draw for the round of 16 was held on 24 February 2023.

Statistics

Appearances and goals
Last updated on 13 March 2023.

|-
|colspan="14"|Youth players:

|-
|colspan="14"|Out to loan:

|-
|colspan="14"|Players no longer at the club:

|}

Top scorers
Includes all competitive matches. The list is sorted by shirt number when total goals are equal.
Last updated on 17 March 2023

Hat-tricks

Disciplinary record
Includes all competitive matches. Players with 1 card or more included only.

Last updated on 17 March 2023

Clean sheets
Last updated on 17 March 2023

Notes

References

External links
 

Ferencvárosi TC seasons
Ferencvárosi TC
Ferencvárosi TC